Diduga trichophora is a moth of the family Erebidae first described by George Hampson in 1900. It is found on Bali, Java, Sumatra and Borneo, as well as in southern Myanmar. The habitat consists of lowland forests.

References

Nudariina
Moths described in 1900